Oncotylus is a genus of plant bugs in the family Miridae. There are at least 20 described species in Oncotylus.

Species
These 20 species belong to the genus Oncotylus:

 Oncotylus affinis Jakovlev, 1882
 Oncotylus anatolicus Wagner, 1969
 Oncotylus basicornis Horváth, 1901
 Oncotylus bolivari Reuter, 1900
 Oncotylus desertorum Reuter, 1879
 Oncotylus ferulae V.Putshkov, 1975
 Oncotylus guttulatus Uhler, 1894
 Oncotylus horvathi Reuter, 1901
 Oncotylus innotatus Wagner, 1969
 Oncotylus longicornis Wagner, 1969
 Oncotylus nigdensis Linnavuori, 1961
 Oncotylus nigricornis Saunders, 1876
 Oncotylus persicus Reuter, 1879
 Oncotylus punctiger Reuter, 1894
 Oncotylus punctipes Reuter, 1875
 Oncotylus pyrethri (Becker, 1864)
 Oncotylus reuteri Reuter, 1879
 Oncotylus setulosus (Herrich-Schaeffer, 1837)
 Oncotylus viridiflavus (Goeze, 1778)
 Oncotylus vitticeps Reuter, 1879

References

Further reading

External links

 

Phylini
Articles created by Qbugbot
Miridae genera